Apache Superset is an open-source software application for data exploration and data visualization able to handle data at petabyte scale (big data). The application started as a hack-a-thon project by Maxime Beauchemin (creator of Apache Airflow) while working at Airbnb and entered the Apache Incubator program in 2017. In addition to Airbnb, the project has seen significant contributions from other leading technology companies, including Lyft and Dropbox. Superset graduated from the incubator program and became a top-level project at the Apache Software Foundation in 2021.

Features
 Dashboard creation
 Enterprise authentication (OpenID, LDAP, OAuth...)
 Integration with Apache ECharts
 Lightweight semantic layer
 Visualization plugin support
 Compatible with most SQL-speaking datasources

Managed Providers
Maxime Beauchemin's company, Preset, offers Superset as a managed service (SaaS).

Linked Articles
Apache Airflow

References

External links 
 

Apache Software Foundation
Data analysis software